Tigerenten Club is a German children's television programme. The programme involves a mix of games, quizzes, cartoons and outside reports from the presenters and children, with the aim to educate and entertain. It is produced by SWR in co-operation with other regional broadcasters, and is broadcast on ARD and KiKa.

The logo and the name of the programme is based upon the Tigerente or 'Tigerduck', created by German cartoonist Janosch.

History
The programme was first broadcast on 6 January 1996, as a replacement for a Disney Club franchise programme which moved to RTL. On 15 December 2007, the programme relaunched with a new female presenter, a new studio and an altered format.

Host

Format
Tigerenten Club is recorded several programmes at a time inside studios in the Stauferpark, Göppingen, after months of pre-production work from their offices at SWR in Stuttgart. The format of the programme is a mix of studio magazine programme and game show, where two teams of children, one team called 'Frösche' (frogs), one team called 'Tigerente' (tigerducks), taken from two different schools compete to win prizes.

Each programme is themed around a certain subject and often guests are invited to talk or demonstrate their specialism in that area. Pre-recorded reports are also centred on this theme. Through the programme's 80-minute running time, there are also often cartoons or a children's drama.

During the programme, the teams compete in several games to win points.

Games

Karaoke
One member of the team sings to a song, whilst the other members dance to the beat in the background. If the singer sings the correct notes and the team dance to the beat, the team wins points.

WissQuiz
Team members take it in turns to throw a ball at a large screen, which they do to select a category. The team must then answer a question based on this category in order to gain more points.

TigerenteRodeo
One member from each team sits on a mechanical bull, styled to look like the programme's mascot. The person to stay on the bull as long as possible, wins the prizes - the team with the greatest number of points start a number of seconds later than the team in second place.

Journey of Discovery
Often, the two presenters of the programme go on an 'Entdeckungsreise', or Journey of Discovery, to another country. There, they focus on themes associated with the area, whether positive (such as films, music and general entertainment) or negative (such as homelessness and poverty).

German children's television series
1996 German television series debuts
2000s German television series
2010s German television series
German-language television shows
Das Erste original programming